Karimdowlati (also Romanized as Karīmdowlatī; also known as Moasseseh) is a village in Mollasani Rural District, in the Central District of Bavi County, Khuzestan Province, Iran. At the 2006 census, its population was 40, in 10 families.

References 

Populated places in Bavi County